The Phallogastraceae are a family of fungi in the order Hysterangiales. The family contains 2 genera and 14 species.

References

Hysterangiales
Basidiomycota families
Taxa named by Marcel Locquin